, formerly known as , is a Japanese filmmaker known for his stylistic punk films, which helped spark the cyberpunk movement in Japan. A number of contemporary filmmakers including Quentin Tarantino have cited Ishii's films as an influence.

Early life 
Born Toshihiro Ishii, he grew up in Hakata, and because of all the American military bases in the area, he was exposed to a lot of American rock music. He spent his teenage years a part of the punk rock movement that grew in that region, singing and playing the guitar.

In 1977 he enrolled at Nihon University in Tokyo, and founded Kyōei-sha (Crazy Film Group). He borrowed equipment from the school to shoot his own 8mm and 16mm short films, which featured the style and philosophy of his punk roots. It was difficult for a young person in Japan to make films during that period, and he decided to skip the traditional corporate ladder route to film directing by just making the films himself.

Career 
During his first year of college, one of Ishii's short films called Panic High School got noticed by Nikkatsu, a movie studio known at the time for its pink films. Nikkatsu provided the funding to adapt the short into a feature-length film. Yukihiro Sawada co-directed the film with Ishii, who was still only a sophomore in college. It was around this time that he started going by Sogo Ishii.

Ishii directed his second feature Crazy Thunder Road as his senior thesis for university, and the 16mm film was subsequently bought by Toei, who distributed it in 35mm. As his fame started to grow, a popular punk band named Anarchy hired Ishii to shoot a promo for them, which resulted in a 10-minute film called Anarchy '80 Ishin. He also adapted Katsuhiro Otomo's manga Run into the 30-minute film Shuffle. He continued to use the university's film equipment as long as he could, but since he had no intentions of actually graduating, they eventually kicked him out.

In 1982, Ishii directed Burst City, an action film about a wild gang of quasi-mutant bikers who ride into a town staging protests against the construction of a nearby nuclear reactor plant. The film starred members of Japanese punk bands The Roosters, The Rockers, The Stalin and Inu, among others. He became a favorite among rebel and punk cineastes in Japan. The film is also credited as a precursor to the underground Japanese cyberpunk movement that emerged later in the decade.

Ishii took a short break from filmmaking in 1983 to form a band called Sogo Ishii and the Bacillus Army, which recorded one album, Asia Strikes Back. He also created a 30 min film for the band that was played during their tour. In 1984 he released his fourth feature film, The Crazy Family.

After the release of The Crazy Family, there was a period of ten years where Ishii couldn't get any funding to make another feature film. His previous films had been very popular with foreign film festival audiences, but not with Japanese ones: they didn't understand his films. He spent his time during this gap making shorts, music videos, and concert films, including ones for The Roosters and Einstürzende Neubauten.

Finally in 1994, he was hired to direct the feature film Angel Dust. Around this time he started to change his filmmaking style partly because he wanted to challenge himself to something new, but also because it had been very difficult to find funding for the types of films he made before. During this period he directed two films that were less plot driven: August in the Water and Labyrinth of Dreams.

The actor Tadanobu Asano teamed up with Ishii in 1996 to form the experimental noise band MACH-1.67, which would later compose some of the music for the film Electric Dragon 80.000 V. Ishii directed two films back to back: Gojoe, a 2000 action film about 12th century Japan, and Electric Dragon 80.000 V, a 2001 black-and-white 55-minute film starring Tadanobu Asano and Masatoshi Nagase. These two films combined the abstract style of his recent films with the intense energy of his early works. Ishii himself described this transition: "When I was young, all I could think about was speed. Then I wanted to start to slow things down a bit—now both are important." While Electric Dragon was praised by critics, both films were huge financial flops: so much so that they put Suncent Cinema Works out of business.

Those films were followed by another ten-year gap in making feature films. Ishii started teaching film at Kobe Design University in 2006, and spent those ten years focused on teaching and experimenting with digital filmmaking by creating music videos, television episodes, and experimental shorts.

In 2012, he returned with Isn't Anyone Alive?, changing his name from Sogo Ishii to Gakuryu Ishii (Gakuryu meaning dragon). In 2013 he released The Flower of Shanidar, which stars Gō Ayano and Hana Kuroki,. In 2016, Ishii released the erotic fantasy film Bitter Honey (Mitsu no aware), based on the novel by Murō Saisei, about the relationship between a dying writer, played by Ren Osugi, and his goldfish who takes the form of a beautiful girl, played by Fumi Nikaidō. In June 2018 he released Punk Samurai Slash Down, which was produced by NTT DoCoMo.

Filmography

Feature films 
 Panic High School (1978)
 Crazy Thunder Road (1980)
 Burst City (1982)
 The Crazy Family (1984)
 Halber Mensch (1986)
 Angel Dust (1994)
 August in the Water (1995)
 Labyrinth of Dreams (1997)
 Gojoe: Spirit War Chronicle (2000)
 Dead End Run (2003)
 Mirrored Mind (2005)
 Isn't Anyone Alive? (2012)
 The Flower of Shanidar (2013)
 Soredake / That's It (2015)
 Mitsu no aware / Bitter Honey (2016)
 Punk Samurai Slash Down (2018)

Short films and Videos
 Panic High School (1977)
 Solitude of One Divided by 880,000 (1978)
 Charge! Hakata Gangsters (1978)
 Hashiru (1979)
 Anarchy '80 Ishin (1981)
 Shuffle (1981)
 Asia Strikes Back (1983)
 Halber Mensch (1986)
 The Master of Shiatsu (1989)
 Dumb Numb Live Friction 1989 (1989)
 J-Movie Wars: Tokyo Blood (1993)
 Electric Dragon 80.000 V (2001)
 Toki yo Tomare, Kimi wa Utsukushii (2002)
 60 Seconds of Solitude in Year Zero (2011)
 Neo Ultra Q'' (2013)

References

External links 
 
 
 

1957 births
Living people
People from Fukuoka Prefecture
Nihon University alumni
Japanese film directors